Mehndi Hai Rachne Waali is an Indian Hindi-language television drama series that premiered on 15 February 2021 on StarPlus. It is loosely based on the Star Maa's Telugu series Gorintaku. Produced by SOL Productions and Sandiip Films, it stars Shivangi Khedkar and Sai Ketan Rao.

Plot
The story revolves around a hardworking widowed woman named Pallavi who loves her in-laws very much and sacrifices everything to fulfill all their needs.

Widowed Pallavi is devoted to her in-laws while loner Raghav, a business magnate, is devoted to money. One day, these polar opposites meet and fall in love. Pallavi was widowed at a young age, while Raghav was cheated out of love. Raghav lives a lonely life because of his bitter experience with love, but his belief in love doesn’t end completely. Pallavi isn’t ready to accept anyone in her life so soon, but she finds Raghav charming despite his arrogant personality. Raghav appears strict but is actually soft-hearted and honest, which wins Pallavi’s heart, and the two get married. How they manage their marital life against all odds forms the crux of the story.

Cast

Main
 Shivangi Khedkar as Pallavi Raghav Rao (formerly Deshmukh) (née Sawant): Raghav's wife; Mandar's former wife; caretaker of Deshmukh Saree Empoium (2021)
 Sai Ketan Rao as Raghav Rao: Pallavi's husband; owner of Jayati Jewels (2021)

Recurring
 Ashok Phal Dessai as Mandar Deshmukh (alias Raja): Pallavi's vengeful former husband who was presumed dead; Sharda and Vijay's elder son; Devyani's murderer (2021)
 Milind Phatak as Vijay Deshmukh: Pallavi's former father-in-law; Sharda's husband; Mandar and Nikhil's father; owner of Deshmukh Saree Emporium (2021)
Sameer Deshpande replaced Milind Phatak (2021)
 Asmita Ajgaonkar as Sharda Deshmukh: Pallavi's former mother-in-law, Vijay's wife, Mandar and Nikhil's mother (2021)
 Karan Manocha as Nikhil Deshmukh: Pallavi's former brother-in-law; Vijay and Sharda's younger son (2021)
 Ajinkya Joshi as Milind Deshmukh: Vijay's younger brother; Sulochana's husband; Mansi and Amruta's father; Pallavi's former uncle-in-law (2021)
 Snehal Reddy as Sulochana Deshmukh: Milind's wife; Mansi and Amruta's mother; Pallavi's former aunt-in-law (2021)
 Rutuja Sawant as Mansi Deshmukh: Milind and Sulochana's elder daughter; Amruta's elder sister, Rahul's ex-fiancée, Pallavi's former cousin sister-in-law (2021)
 Priyanka Dhavale as Amruta Deshmukh: Milind and Sulochana's younger daughter, Mansi's younger sister, Pallavi's former cousin sister-in-law (2021)
 Snehal Borkar as Krishna: Pallavi's friend and assistant at Deshmukh Saree Emporium (2021)
 Ragini Shah as Jaya Rao: Raghav, Kirti and Arjun's mother; Ajit's wife; Pallavi's mother-in-law (2021)
Geeta Tyagi replaced Ragini Shah (2021)
 Sayli Salunkhe as Kirti Rao: Raghav's younger sister; Pallavi's friend turned sister-in-law; Sunny's wife (2021)
 Kushagre Dua as Sunny Ahuja: Kirti's husband (2021)
 Himanshu Bamzai as Farhad Nawaz: Raghav's secretary, right-hand man and friend (2021)
 Krishna Kaurav as Harish: Raghav's bodyguard (2021)
 Jeet Pol as Madan: Raghav's bodyguard (2021)
 Shweta Vyas as Esha Madhavan: Raghav’s former girlfriend and obsessed lover (2021)
 Jatin Sharma as Sumit: Esha's estranged husband (2021)
 Sarika Raghwa as Anjali: She tried to get intimate with Raghav despite being engaged to someone else. Later Raghav exposed her in front of her fiancé (2021)
 Saim Khan as Akash: Brother of Pallavi's friend and Kirti's love-interest (2021)
 Gourav Raj Puri as Rahul: Mansi's ex-fiancé; Asha's son (2021)
 Sonal Palan as Asha: Rahul's mother (2021)
 Manoj Kaushik as Siddhesh Sawant: Pallavi's elder brother; Pawani's husband; Raghav's brother-in-law (2021)
 Payal Singh as Pawani Sawant: Siddhesh's wife; Pallavi's sister-in-law; Raghav's sister-in-law (2021)
 Ankit Gulati as Vedant (Ved) aka Lion: Raghav's former best friend and business partner who turned enemy due to business differences (2021)
 Snehal Waghmare as ACP Laxmi Singh: Raghav's enemy (2021)
 Abhay Verma as Rocky: Sunny's friend (2021)
 Ishrat Khan as Dr. Ramya: Mandar/Raja's doctor turn into Amma (2021)
 Supreet Nikam as Vishnu: Mandar/Raja's friend (2021)
 Deepak Soni as Inspector Nitin reddy (2021)

Awards

Production

Preparation
Shivangi Khedkar said, "My character is of a Maharashtrian girl, Pallavi. Since our whole team is Marathi, everyone helps me in speaking words in their language. Even I am working hard on myself".

Filming
Based on the backdrop of Hyderabad, the series is mainly filmed at sets in Kolhapur in Maharashtra while some initial sequences were shot in Hyderabad in early February 2021.

On 13 April 2021, Chief Minister of Maharashtra, Uddhav Thackeray announced a sudden curfew due to increased COVID-19 cases, and the production halted on 14 April 2021. The series team decided to temporarily move their shooting location to Ramoji Film City in Hyderabad until the next hearing.

Release
It premiered on 15 February 2021 at the 6:30 PM on StarPlus. However, on 11 October 2021, it was shifted to the early-evening slot of 5:30 PM to accommodate upcoming show, Vidrohi.

Adaptations

Reception

Ratings
In UK, the series launched on 15 February 2021 with 74.6 thousand viewers being the third most watched Indian television series. On 30 March 2021, it was the most watched series with a viewership of 38.2 thousand. Then on the week ending on the 12 April 2021, it was the second most watched series (98.3 thousand viewers). The show became popular once again, as the most-watched series on the 17 April 2021, then become the second most watched series during the week ending on 13 June 2021.

The series went off air on 27 November 2021, after 246 episodes.

Soundtrack

The title song "Mehndi Hai Rachne Waali" was composed by Shubham Sundaram, written by Aditya Chakravarty, and sung by Anweshaa.

References

External links 
 Mehndi Hai Rachne Waali on Hotstar

2021 Indian television series debuts
StarPlus original programming
Hindi-language television shows
Indian television soap operas
Television shows set in Hyderabad, India